Autocross is a timed race through a course of traffic cones on a flat, paved surface.

Autocross may also refer to:

British autocross, similar to American autocross but races are held on dirt or grass surfaces that may not be flat
FIA Autocross, similar to British autocross but the cars start at the same time

See also
Autotesting, a British motoring amateur competition that typically includes driving the vehicle in reverse gear
Autosolo, the closest British equivalent of American Autocross
Gymkhana (motorsport), a Japanese motorsport event that is similar to American Autocross
Motorkhana, a motorsport in Australia and New Zealand
Rallycross, a motorsport in which part of the race track is unpaved